Standard Canadian English is the largely homogeneous variety of Canadian English that is spoken particularly across Ontario and Western Canada, as well as throughout Canada among urban middle-class speakers from English-speaking families, excluding the regional dialects of Atlantic Canadian English. Canadian English has a mostly uniform phonology and much less dialectal diversity than neighbouring American English. A subset of the dialect geographically at its central core, excluding British Columbia to the west and everything east of Montréal, has been called Inland Canadian English.

Phonetics and phonology

Almost all Canadians have the cot–caught merger, which also occurs primarily in the Western United States but also often elsewhere in the country, especially recently. Speakers with the merger produce the vowels identically and often fail to hear the difference when speakers without the merger, such as General American and Inland Northern American English, pronounce the vowels. The merger has existed in Canada for several generations.

As with Canadian raising, the advancement of the raised nucleus can be a regional indicator.

The latter set of words often distinguishes Canadian from American pronunciation. In Standard Canadian English, there is no distinction between horse and hoarse.

The merger creates a gap in the short vowel subsystem and triggers a sound change known as the Canadian Shift, which involves the front lax vowels . The  of bat is lowered and retracted in the direction of  except in some environments, as is noted below.

Therefore, in Canadian English, the short a of trap or bath and the broad ah quality of spa or lot are shifted in the opposite way from those of the Northern Cities shift, which is found across the border in Inland Northern American English, and is causing both dialects to diverge. In fact, the Canadian short-a is very similar in quality to Inland Northern spa or lot. For example, the production  would be recognized as map in Canada but mop in Inland Northern United States.

A notable exception to the merger occurs, and some speakers over the age of 60, especially in rural areas in the Prairies, may not exhibit the merger.

Perhaps the most recognizable feature of Canadian English is "Canadian raising," which is found most prominently throughout central and west-central Canada and in parts of the Atlantic Provinces.

Before voiceless consonants,  becomes . Also, about then sounds like a boat, which is often inaccurately represented as sounding like "a boot" for comic effect in American popular culture.

In General American, out is typically , but with slight Canadian raising, it may sound more like , and with the strong Canadian raising of the Prairies and Nova Scotia, it may sound more like . Canadian raising makes words like height and hide have two different vowel qualities.

Especially in parts of the Atlantic Provinces, some Canadians do not have Canadian raising. On the other hand, certain non-Canadian accents use Canadian raising. In the United States, it can be found in areas near the border in dialects in the Upper Midwest, Pacific Northwest, and Northeastern New England (like Boston) dialects, but Canadian raising is much less common than in Canada.

Because of Canadian raising, many speakers are able to distinguish between words such as writer and rider, which can otherwise be pronounced the same in North American dialects, which typically turn both intervocalic  and  into an alveolar flap.

When not in a raised position and before voiceless consonants,  is fronted to  before nasals and low-central  elsewhere.

Unlike many American English dialects,  remains a low-front vowel in most environments in Canadian English. Raising along the front periphery of the vowel space is restricted to two environments, before nasal and voiced velar consonants, and even then varies regionally. Ontario and Maritime Canadian English often show some raising before nasals, but it is less extreme than in many American varieties. Much less raising is heard on the Prairies, and some ethnic groups in Montreal show no pre-nasal raising at all. On the other hand, some speakers in the Prairies have raising of  before voiced velars ( and ), with an up-glide rather than an in-glide, and so bag can almost rhyme with vague. For most Canadian speakers,  is also realized higher as  before .

Phonemic incidence

Although Canadian English phonology is part of the greater North American sound system and so is therefore similar to American English phonology, the pronunciation of particular words may have British influence, and other pronunciations are uniquely Canadian. The Cambridge History of the English Language states, "What perhaps most characterizes Canadian speakers, however, is their use of several possible variant pronunciations for the same word, sometimes even in the same sentence."
 The name of the letter Z is normally the Anglo-European (and French) zed, and the American zee is less common in Canada and often stigmatized but remains common, especially for younger speakers.
 Lieutenant was historically pronounced as the British , rather than the American , and older speakers and official usage in military and government contexts typically still follow the older practice, but most younger speakers and many middle-aged speakers have shifted to the American pronunciation. Some middle-aged speakers cannot even remember the existence of the older pronunciation, even when they are specifically asked whether they can think of another pronunciation. Only 14-19% of 14-year-olds used the traditional pronunciation in a survey in 1972, and in early 2017, they were at least 57 years old.
 In the words adult and composite, the stress is usually on the first syllable ( ~), as in Britain.
That also applies to older loans like drama or Apache. The latter was the preferred pronunciation of the Canadian Army during World War II.
Resource, diagnose, and visa also have .
 The word milk is pronounced  (to rhyme with elk) by some speakers but  (to rhyme with ilk) by others.

Features shared with General American
Like most other North American English dialects, Canadian English is almost always spoken with a rhotic accent, meaning that the r sound is preserved in any environment and not "dropped" after vowels, as commonly done by, for example, speakers in central and southern England where it is only pronounced when preceding a vowel.

Like General American, Canadian English possesses a wide range of phonological mergers, many of which are not found in other major varieties of English: the Mary–marry–merry merger which makes word pairs like Barry/berry, Carrie/Kerry,  hairy/Harry, perish/parish, etc. as well as trios like airable/errable/arable and Mary/merry/marry have identical pronunciations (however, a distinction between the marry and merry sets remains in Montreal); the father–bother merger that makes lager/logger, con/Kahn, etc. sound identical; the very common horse–hoarse merger making pairs like for/four, horse/hoarse, morning/mourning, war/wore etc. perfect homophones (as in California English, the vowel is phonemicized as  due to the cot–caught merger:  etc.); and the prevalent wine–whine merger which produces homophone pairs like Wales/whales, wear/where, wine/whine etc. by, in most cases, eliminating  (ʍ), except in some older speakers.

For some speakers, the merger is incomplete and 't' before a reduced vowel is sometimes not tapped following  or  when it represents underlying 't'; thus greater and grader, and unbitten and unbidden are distinguished.

Many Canadian speakers have the typical American dropping of  after alveolar consonants, so that new, duke, Tuesday, suit, resume, lute, for instance, are pronounced  (rather than ), . Traditionally, glide retention in these contexts has occasionally been held to be a shibboleth distinguishing Canadians from Americans. However, in a survey conducted in the Golden Horseshoe area of Southern Ontario in 1994, over 80% of respondents under the age of 40 pronounced student and news, for instance, without .

Otherwise it primarily is found in speakers from not just California but also from other Western states and Midwestern areas including the Upper Midwest. Speakers who use the  variant use it only for the underlying , which makes taking with a dropped "g" no longer homophonous with taken. This pronunciation is otherwise incorrect and was described as a "corruption of the language" to listeners.

Notes

References

Bibliography
 
 
 
 
 
 

Canadian English
English language in Canada